The Nigerian National Assembly delegation from Cross River comprises three Senators representing Cross River North, Cross River South, and Cross River Central, and eight Representatives representing  Calabar Munincipal/Odukpani, Ogoja/Iyala, Ikom/Boki, Yakurr/Abi, Bekwarra/Obudu/Obanliku, Akpabuyo/Bakassi/Calabar South, Akamkpa/biase, and Obubra/ Etung.

Fourth Republic

The 4th Parliament (1999 - 2003)

References
Official Website - National Assembly House of Representatives (Cross River State)
Senator List

Politics of Cross River State
National Assembly (Nigeria) delegations by state